The 2019 Tell Rifaat Clashes were a military confrontation between Turkey and allied Free Syrian Army groups against the Kurdish People's Protection Units (YPG) in early May 2019.

Background
The clashes began after two Turkish soldiers were killed on 4 May 2019 in a confrontation with the YPG and one was injured. In retaliation the Turkish Defense Ministry claimed to have killed a total of 23 YPG fighters; following the incident a Turkish official told Reuters that a larger operation would be launched "if necessary".

Timeline
On 4 May 2019, the Syrian National Army (SNA) announced it had initiated an operation against the YPG in the villages near Tell Rifaat. The SNA managed to initially capture the three villages of Mar'anaz, Al-Malikiyah, and Shawarighat al Arz, facing little resistance. After taking the villages the SNA stated “Our aspiration is to reach Tel Rifaat and what is beyond it.” However, subsequently, due to heavy shelling by SDF as well as pro-government forces and a large number of landmines in the area, the SNA and the Turkish Armed Forces were forced to withdraw and the Kurdish-led forces recaptured all three villages.

The following day, it was reported that the offensive had been cancelled in favor of more negotiations between Turkey and Russia to set up a joint demilitarized zone in the area.

Aftermath
On 18 May 2019, new fighting erupted in the Tell Rifaat area, with five rebels and one civilian being killed.
On 9 June 2019, fighters of the Syrian Democratic Forces attacked Turkish troops, killing 2 soldier and wounding 7. In response, the Turkish Armed Forces responded days later with shelling.

See also
Operation Olive Branch 
SDF insurgency in Northern Aleppo
2018 Syrian-Turkish border clashes

References

2019 in Syria
Conflicts in 2019
May 2019 events in Syria
Military operations of the Syrian civil war in 2019
Military operations of the Syrian civil war involving Turkey
Military operations of the Syrian civil war involving the Free Syrian Army
Military operations of the Syrian civil war involving the Syrian Democratic Forces
Military operations of the Syrian civil war involving the People's Protection Units
Military operations of the Syrian civil war involving the Syrian government
Syrian National Army
Aleppo Governorate in the Syrian civil war